Ñuble Province was one of the provinces of the Chilean region of Bío Bío (VIII). It has in 2017 a population of 441,604 inhabitants. Its capital was the city of Chillán. On the 6th of September of 2018, the province became the Ñuble Region.

History
The province was created in 1974 from the territory of the historical province of Ñuble. Two years later, the communes of Coelemu and Ránquil from Concepción Province, and the commune of Tucapel from Bío Bío Province, were added.
 
Following the 8.8 magnitude earthquake and tsunami, at least eight small communities and two towns were abandoned by residents, who took up makeshift camps in the hills, fearful of further tsunamis. Over 800 residences in the town of Quirihue were destroyed, leaving little for townspeople to return to.

In 2015 the Ñuble Region law which converts the Ñuble Province into a Region, was proposed. In August 2017 a law to create the new territorial division was promulgated by the President of the Republic in Chillán. It became operational on 6 September 2018.

Administration
As a province, Ñuble was a second-level administrative division of Chile, governed by a provincial governor who was appointed by the president.

Communes
The province used to comprise 21 communes, each governed by a municipality consisting of an elected alcalde and municipal council.

 Bulnes
 Cobquecura
 Coelemu
 Coihueco
 Chillán
 Chillán Viejo
 El Carmen
 Ninhue
 Ñiquén (San Gregorio de Ñiquén)
 Pemuco
 Pinto
 Portezuelo
 Quillón
 Quirihue
 Ránquil
 San Carlos
 San Fabián
 San Ignacio
 San Nicolás
 Treguaco
 Yungay

See also
 Ñuble Region

References 

 

Former provinces of Chile
Provinces of Biobío Region